Dennis Jones (13 November 1936 – 19 December 1999) was an Australian rules footballer who played with Melbourne in the Victorian Football League (VFL). He then moved to South Australia where he coached Central Districts to the finals for the first time.

Jones, a half-back, made his senior VFL debut in 1956 and was a member of Melbourne's 1959 premiership side. He retired from the VFL aged 25, and in 1968 became the senior coach of the South Australian National Football League (SANFL) club Central District. Jones remained in that role for four seasons before moving to the Western Australian Football League (WAFL) to coach West Perth, and getting them to a Grand Final. In 1978 Jones rejoined Melbourne, where he had been appointed coach, but he could not prevent the team from finishing with the wooden spoon.

References

Holmesby, Russell and Main, Jim (2007). The Encyclopedia of AFL Footballers. 7th ed. Melbourne: Bas Publishing.

External links

Demonwiki profile

1936 births
1999 deaths
Melbourne Football Club players
Melbourne Football Club coaches
Central District Football Club coaches
West Perth Football Club coaches
Prahran Football Club coaches
Australian rules footballers from Victoria (Australia)
Melbourne Football Club Premiership players
One-time VFL/AFL Premiership players